Evgeny  Andreevich Turbin (born September 10, 1979, Moscow, USSR) is a Russian football referee, has a regional category. Serves matches of the Russian Premier League.

Career
Judging career Evgeny  Turbin began in 2001, working as a line referee in the Russian Professional Football League. Then he worked as a line manager for the matches of the Russian Premier League doubles tournament and the Russian Cup. In 2003, Turbin became the main arbiter for the second division games, and in 2006 the first.

In the Premier League as the main arbiter debuted on November 7, 2009, in the match of the 28th round of FC Khimki —  FC Tom Tomsk. The meeting ended with the victory of the guests 3:1, Turbin showed four yellow cards to the players of the hosts.

References

External links
 

1979 births
Sportspeople from Moscow
Living people
Russian football referees